German submarine U-9 was a Type IIB U-boat of Nazi Germany's Kriegsmarine. Her keel was laid down on 8 February 1935, by Germaniawerft in Kiel as yard number 543. She was launched on 30 July 1935 and commissioned on 21 August, with Korvettenkapitän Hans-Günther Looff in command.

U-9 conducted 19 patrols under a series of commanders, including U-boat ace Wolfgang Lüth, sinking eight ships totalling  and damaging another displacing 412 tons. This included the French Sirène class coastal submarine .

She was sunk by Soviet bombs on 20 August 1944. Her wreck was later raised by the Soviets, repaired and recommissioned as TS-16 but was broken up in December 1946 because of her poor performance.

Design
German Type IIB submarines were enlarged versions of the original Type IIs. U-9 had a displacement of  when at the surface and  while submerged. She had two shafts and two  propellers.

U-9 was fitted with three  torpedo tubes at the bow, five torpedoes or up to twelve Type A torpedo mines, and a  anti-aircraft gun. The boat had a complement of twenty.

Service history

U-9 was ordered on 20 July 1934, i.e. in violation of the Versailles Treaty, which denied Germany possession of submarines. The U-boat was not laid down until 11 March 1935, and launched on 29 June 1935, within weeks of the Anglo-German Naval Agreement, which granted Germany parity with the British Empire in submarines. On 27 December 1942, at 16:20, off Sochi in the Black Sea, a Soviet minesweeper dropped eight depth charges on the boat, causing minor damage. On 31 Mar 1944
U-9 was lying in Feodosia to refuel when the harbor was attacked by 18 Il-2 ground attack aircraft. The boat was damaged by strafing and a bomb hit made a dent in the pressure hull on port side aft, also wounding the commander, who operated the 20mm AA gun himself, with splinters. The gunners claimed hits on two aircraft that were seen to crash. Eleven day later, again in the Black Sea, south of Yalta, depth charges from a Soviet escort caused minor damage.

Fate
To serve in the 30th U-boat Flotilla, the submarine was transported in sections along the Danube to the Romanian port of Galați. She was then re-assembled by the Romanians at the Galați shipyard and sent to the Black Sea. At 10:30 on 20 August 1944, at Constanţa in Romania in position , U-9 was sunk by bombs from Soviet aircraft. The Soviets raised the boat and brought her into Mykolaiv in 1945.

Summary of raiding history

References

Notes

Citations

Bibliography

External links
 

German Type II submarines
U-boats commissioned in 1935
U-boats sunk in 1944
World War II submarines of Germany
1935 ships
Ships built in Kiel
Ships built in Romania
World War II shipwrecks in the Black Sea
U-boats sunk by Soviet aircraft
Foreign submarines of the Soviet Navy
Maritime incidents in August 1944